Percy Jones (born 3 December 1947) is a Welsh bass guitarist known as a member of the jazz fusion ensemble Brand X, from 1974-1980, and 1992-1999.

Jones, who was born near Llandrindod Wells, has also done extensive work as a session musician, and has been active with other groups. He played with a New York City trio called Stone Tiger (featuring guitarist Bill Frisell and drummers Mike Clark and Dougie Bowne during different periods) in 1982/83 Jones was also the driving force behind Tunnels, an improvisation collective which released four albums including Progressivity and Live From The Knitting Factory. Residing in New York, he currently is a member of MJ12, an instrumental group based in NYC.

Jones was also a member of the jazz fusion group Soft Machine, the poetry rock group The Liverpool Scene (featuring poet Adrian Henri), and has contributed to recordings by Kate Bush, David Sylvian, Brian Eno, Steve Hackett, Paranoise, Suzanne Vega, Richard Barbieri and Fovea Hex, amongst others.

He released a solo album, Cape Catastrophe in 1990.

Artistry

Jones's playing style incorporates an unconventional three-finger right hand technique to pluck the strings (like Les Claypool and, before him, John Entwistle), in contrast to most bassists using two fingers. He also employs sliding harmonics. Over the years, he has employed various other extended techniques, such as deliberately pulling the strings over the edges of the fingerboard (creating a distinctive buzzing rattle) and thumb-on-the-fingerboard left hand technique to achieve wider-interval double stops than are normally possible.

His first recordings with Brand X employed a fretless Fender Precision bass, though he later switched to what became his trademark Wal basses, produced by Electric Wood Limited in the UK. More recently, Jones switched to custom-built Ibanez basses, citing a desire to simply try something different after many successful years using the Wal.

The uniqueness of his approach, particularly with Brand X and on his contributions to Brian Eno's Another Green World and Before and After Science LPs of the 1970s, cast a long shadow. Perhaps the most obvious example of this can be clearly seen in the work of Japan bassist Mick Karn, who acknowledged Jones as an influence at various times during his career.

Electronics work

Jones studied Electronic Engineering at the University of Liverpool, and has used his electronics skills to potent effect over the years. In the late 1970s, he designed and built various analog signal processors for use with the bass, perhaps the most unusual of which was an amplitude- and frequency-sensitive flanger that would vary the character of its flanging effect based on what notes were being played into it, and how loudly they were being played. His other designs included an envelope-controlled Voltage Controlled Filter (VCF), which can be heard on the track "Noddy Goes to Sweden" on Brand X's 1980 album Do They Hurt?, as well as an analog drum machine, which featured preset rhythms in various odd time signatures such as 15/16.

He is also an avid amateur radio operator and has developed several innovative, compact antenna designs for the amateur radio HF bands.

References

External links
 
 

1947 births
Living people
People from Llandrindod Wells
Avant-garde jazz musicians
Jazz fusion musicians
British bass guitarists
Male bass guitarists
Alumni of the University of Liverpool
British male jazz musicians
Brand X members
Amateur radio people